The Walmart NW Arkansas Championship is an annual women's professional golf tournament on the LPGA Tour in Rogers, Arkansas, north of Fayetteville. First played  in 2007, all editions of the tournament have been played at Pinnacle Country Club.

Procter & Gamble (P&G), a manufacturer of a wide range of consumer goods, became the title sponsor in 2008. The 2008 and 2009 editions were prefaced with "P&G Beauty", with the word "Beauty" dropped starting in 2010. Walmart, based in nearby Bentonville and the world's largest public corporation, became the presenting sponsor in 2010. Walmart became the title sponsor in 2011, with P&G as the presenting sponsor.

History
Due to inclement weather in 2007, only the first round on Friday was completed which classified it as an "unofficial tournament." An LPGA event must be at least 36 holes to qualify as official. Stacy Lewis, then a senior at the University of Arkansas, led after 18 holes and was declared the unofficial winner. The tournament purse was cut in half and all professionals received winnings based on 50% of what they would have earned had the tournament been completed. Because Lewis was an amateur she received no earnings, and all earnings by LPGA members were considered unofficial.

Tournament names through the years: 
2007: LPGA NW Arkansas Championship Presented by John Q. Hammons
2008–2009: P&G Beauty NW Arkansas Championship Presented by John Q. Hammons
2010: P&G NW Arkansas Championship Presented by Walmart
2011–: Walmart NW Arkansas Championship Presented by P&G

Winners

* The 2007 tournament was reduced to 18 holes and declared unofficial because of multiple rain delays; the $1.25 million purse was halved.Lewis was an amateur (and reigning NCAA champion); three professionals at 66 tied for the top money spot.The original tournament dates in 2007 were September 7–9.

Tournament records

Source:

References

External links 

LPGA.com  – tournament microsite
Pinnacle Country Club

LPGA Tour events
Golf in Arkansas
History of women in Arkansas
Rogers, Arkansas